Philip Peter B. Butel (born June 18, 1980) is a Filipino basketball player who last played for the Rizal Golden Coolers of the Maharlika Pilipinas Basketball League (MPBL). He was signed by Sta. Lucia in 2007 as a free agent.

Player profile
Butel played three games in the 2007–08 PBA Philippine Cup, though he only scored 2 points. During the start of the 2009 PBA Fiesta Conference, he was waived by the Sta. Lucia Realtors.

References

External links
Player Profile
PBA-Online! Profile

1980 births
Filipino men's basketball players
Basketball players from Cagayan
UE Red Warriors basketball players
Living people
People from Tuguegarao
Centers (basketball)
Power forwards (basketball)
Sta. Lucia Realtors players
Maharlika Pilipinas Basketball League players